Two Times Lotte is a 1950 West German film, directed by Josef von Báky and starring Antje Weisgerber, Peter Mosbacher, Jutta Günther and Isa Günther.

Based on a 1949 novel Lisa and Lottie by Erich Kästner, it was made by Bavaria Film at the Emelka Studios near Munich. The film's sets were designed by the art directors Robert Herlth and Willy Schatz.

Cast

References

Bibliography 
 Davidson, John & Hake, Sabine. Framing the Fifties: Cinema in a Divided Germany. Berghahn Books, 2007.

External links 
 

1950 films
1950 comedy films
German comedy films
West German films
1950s German-language films
Films based on Lottie and Lisa
Films directed by Josef von Báky
German black-and-white films
1950s German films
Films shot at Bavaria Studios